A capital region, also called a capital district or capital territory, is a region or district surrounding the country's capital city. It is not always the official term for the region, but may sometimes be used as an informal synonym. Capital regions can exist for either national or subnational capitals.

First-level administrative country subdivisions

Second-level administrative country subdivisions

See also 
Capital districts and territories
Federal district

References 

Types of administrative division